Tower was a slab serif typeface designed by Morris Fuller Benton for American Type Founders and based upon his earlier design for Stymie, but with straight sides to the round letters emphasizing the vertical appearance. Tower Italic was designed but not cast.  In 1936, Tower Bold was started by the same designer, but was instead made into Stymie Bold Condensed.

Digital type
Tower was digitized as Constructa by Elizabeth Cory Holzman for Font Bureau. Holzman's revival includes a light weight called Constructa Thin and an extra bold called Constructa Black.

References

Blackwell, Lewis. 20th Century Type. Yale University Press, 2004. .
Fiedl, Frederich; Nicholas Ott & Bernard Stein. Typography: An Encyclopedic Survey of Type Design and Techniques Through History. Black Dog & Leventhal, 1998. .
Jaspert, W.; Pincus, W.; Turner Berry & A. F. Johnson. The Encyclopedia of Type Faces. Blandford Press Ltd., 1953, 1983. .
Macmillan, Neil. An A–Z of Type Designers. Yale University Press, 2006. .

American Type Founders typefaces
Letterpress typefaces
Digital typefaces
Typefaces and fonts introduced in 1936
Typefaces designed by Morris Fuller Benton
Geometric slab-serif typefaces